The 2004 Armenian First League season started on 1 May 2004. The last matches were played on 15 November 2004. Pyunik-2 became the league champions, but because they are a reserve team they were unable to promote to the Armenian Premier League. As a result, the second placed team Lernayin Artsakh FC was given promotion.

Overview
 Araks Ararat FC and Lernayin Artsakh FC were relegated and withdrew from the Armenian Premier League respectively. 
 Dinamo FA Yerevan were renamed as Dinamo Yerevan
 Spartak Yerevan FC became the reserve team of FC Banants and as a result were named Banants-2
 FC Zenit Charentsavan and FC Dinamo-VZ Yerevan are the reserve teams of Dinamo-Zenit Yerevan.
 FC Ararat Yerevan was expelled from the Premier League in 2003, so they restarted the 2004 season in the First League.
 Reserve teams, such as Pyunik-2, cannot be promoted.

League table

See also
 2004 Armenian Premier League
 2004 Armenian Cup

External links
 RSSSF: Armenia 2004 - Second Level

Armenian First League seasons
2
Armenia
Armenia